Knock-off Nigel was a 2007 television campaign against copyright infringement in the United Kingdom.

The campaign included a series of television advertisements in which the eponymous Nigel was described as having bought unlicenced DVDs, illegally downloaded films, and so on, to the accompaniment of a derisive song: "He's a knock-off Nigel..." As a result of his wrongdoings, Nigel was left lonely and despised by his peers.

Further reading
 "U.K. Industry Trust Unveils 'Knock-Off' Ad Campaign" by Lars Brandle, Billboard.com (May 15, 2007)
 The SAGE Handbook of Intellectual Property, ed. Debora Halbert and Matthew David, SAGE Publications (2014)
 Understanding Copyright: Intellectual Property in the Digital Age by Bethany Klein, Giles Moss, Lee Edwards, SAGE Publications (2015)
 Transnational Financial Crime by Nikos Passas, Taylor & Francis (2017)
 Film Piracy, Organized Crime, and Terrorism by Gregory F. Treverton, RAND Corporation (2009)

See also
 Beware of illegal video cassettes
 Don't Copy That Floppy
 Home Recording Rights Coalition
 Home Taping Is Killing Music
 Piracy is theft
 Public information film (PIF)
 Public service announcement
 Spin (public relations)
 Steal This Film
 Who Makes Movies?
 You can click, but you can't hide
 You Wouldn't Steal a Car

References

External links
 Knock-off Nigel advert one on YouTube
 Knock-off Nigel advert two on YouTube

British advertising slogans
2007 neologisms
Copyright campaigns
British television commercials
2007 in the United Kingdom